Cardiolucina is a genus of bivalves belonging to the family Lucinidae.

The genus has almost cosmopolitan distribution.

Species

Species:

Cardiolucina agassizii 
Cardiolucina australopilula 
Cardiolucina civica

References

Lucinidae
Bivalve genera